Salignus is a genus of plant bugs in the family Miridae. There are at least three described species in Salignus.

Species
These three species belong to the genus Salignus:
 Salignus distinguendus (Reuter, 1875)
 Salignus duplicatus (Reuter, 1906)
 Salignus tahoensis (Knight, 1917)

References

Further reading

 
 
 
 

Miridae genera
Articles created by Qbugbot
Mirini